Lieutenant-General Sir John George des Reaux Swayne KCB CBE (3 July 1890 – 16 December 1964) was a senior British Army officer who became General Officer Commanding-in-Chief (GOC-in-C) of South-Eastern Command during the Second World War.

Military career
Born the son of William Swayne, the Bishop of Lincoln, Swayne, after being educated at Charterhouse School and the University of Oxford, was commissioned into the Somerset Light Infantry in 1911. He served in the First World War, spending most of it as a prisoner of war.

After the war he was appointed aide-de-camp to the general officer commanding (GOC) Western Command in India before becoming adjutant of his regiment in 1924. He became a general staff officer at the War Office in 1927 and brigade major for 7th Infantry Brigade in 1929. He was made military assistant to the Chief of the Imperial General Staff in 1930 and chief of staff for the International Force for the Saar Plebiscite in Germany in 1934. He was selected to be Commanding Officer (CO) of the 1st Battalion, Royal Northumberland Fusiliers in 1935 and chief instructor at the Staff College, Camberley in 1937.

He served in the Second World War, initially as head of the British Military Mission to the French Grand Quartier Général (GQG) and then as general officer commanding 4th Division from 1941. He was appointed chief of the general staff for Home Forces in 1942 and general officer commanding-in-chief of South Eastern Command in 1942. His final appointment was as chief of the General Staff in India in 1944; he retired in 1946.

References

Bibliography

External links
 British Army Officers 1939−1945
 Generals of World War II

|-

|-

|-

1890 births
1964 deaths
Somerset Light Infantry officers
British Army personnel of World War I
British Army generals of World War II
World War I prisoners of war held by Germany
Knights Commander of the Order of the Bath
Commanders of the Order of the British Empire
British World War I prisoners of war
Graduates of the Staff College, Camberley
Graduates of the Royal College of Defence Studies
People from Warminster
Royal Northumberland Fusiliers officers
Academics of the Staff College, Camberley
British Army lieutenant generals
People educated at Charterhouse School
Alumni of the University of Oxford
Military personnel from Wiltshire